Parliamentary elections for the Kingdom of Croatia-Slavonia Parliament were held on 30–31 May and 1–2 June 1892.

Results

References

Elections in Croatia
Croatia
1892 in Croatia
Elections in Austria-Hungary
May 1892 events
June 1892 events
Kingdom of Croatia-Slavonia
Election and referendum articles with incomplete results